The 1981 NCAA Division I Cross Country Championships were the 43rd annual NCAA Men's Division I Cross Country Championship and the 1st annual NCAA Women's Division I Cross Country Championship to determine the team and individual national champions of NCAA Division I men's and women's collegiate cross country running in the United States. For the first time, a women's national championship was held alongside the men's meet. In all, four different titles were contested: men's and women's individual and team championships.

Held on November 23, 1981, the combined meet was hosted for the second consecutive year by Wichita State University at the Echo Hills Golf Course in Park City, Kansas. The distance for the men's race was 10 kilometers (6.21 miles) while the distance for the women's race was 5 kilometers (3.11 miles).

The men's team national championship was retained again by the UTEP Miners, their seventh, and fourth consecutive, overall title. The individual championship was won by South African runner Matthews Motshwarateu, also from UTEP, with a time of 28:45.80. By placing all of their top 5 in the top 8 finishers, UTEP's score remains the best team score in event history.

The UTEP team, composed of African recruits, was a dominant group of talent, but coach Ted Banks, who had assembled the team was criticized for his recruiting practices and scholarship promises.  Within a year, he had resigned his position as coach.

The inaugural women's team national championship was won by the Virginia Cavaliers, their first. The individual championship was won by Betty Springs, from NC State, with a time of 16:19.00. Given that this was the first edition of this race, Springs' time set the event's distance record.

Qualification
All Division I cross country teams were eligible to qualify for the meet through their placement at various regional qualifying meets. In total, 23 teams and 191 runners contested the men's championship while 13 teams and 113 runners contested the women's title.

Men's title
Distance: 10,000 meters (6.21 miles)

Men's Team Result (Top 10)

Men's Individual Result (Top 10)

Women's title
Distance: 5,000 meters (3.11 miles)

Women's Team Result (Top 10)

Women's Individual Result (Top 10)

See also
NCAA Men's Division II Cross Country Championship 
NCAA Women's Division II Cross Country Championship (began 1981)
NCAA Men's Division III Cross Country Championship
NCAA Women's Division III Cross Country Championship (began 1981)

References

NCAA Cross Country Championships
NCAA Division I Cross Country Championships
NCAA Division I Cross Country Championships
NCAA Division I Cross Country Championships
Park City, Kansas
Track and field in Kansas
Wichita State University